Javier "Javy" López Torres (born November 5, 1970) is a Puerto Rican former catcher in Major League Baseball who played for the Atlanta Braves (1992–2003), Baltimore Orioles (2004–2006) and Boston Red Sox (2006). He batted and threw right-handed. He was named Ponce, Puerto Rico's Athlete of the Year from 1984 to 1987.

Professional career

Atlanta Braves
López (birth name: Javier López Torres ) was signed by the Atlanta Braves in 1987 as an amateur free agent, López made his debut on September 18, 1992, against the Houston Astros. After sharing duties with Charlie O'Brien and Eddie Pérez for four seasons, he established himself as the Braves' regular catcher in 1996. The same season, he led the Braves to win the National League Championship Series, earning the series Most Valuable Player honors. He also made the National League All-Star team from 1997–98. Lopez had his best season in 2003 with a .328 batting average, 43 home runs and 109 RBI in 129 games, including a .378 on-base percentage and a .687 slugging percentage. In that season he broke Todd Hundley's record for most home runs hit in a season by a catcher (41) and was selected to the All-Star Game, winning the Silver Slugger Award and finishing fifth in the National League MVP ballot. While with the Braves, López caught Kent Mercker's no-hitter on April 8, 1994.

Baltimore Orioles
Before the 2004 season, López signed as a free agent with the Baltimore Orioles. He hit .316 with 86 RBI, and the following season hit .278 with 49 RBI, while seeing a decline in his game time from 150 to 103 games.

Boston Red Sox
In the 2006 midseason he was acquired by the Boston Red Sox from Baltimore in exchange for minor league outfielder Adam Stern and cash considerations. López debuted with Boston on the same day after Doug Mirabelli left the game early after an ankle injury. On September 8, the Red Sox released López due to Jason Varitek returning from the disabled list, which minimized his playing time.

Retirement
In January 2007, it was reported that López reached a preliminary agreement on a $750,000, one-year contract with the Colorado Rockies, but he did not play for them during the regular season. Before the 2008 season he signed a minor league deal with an invitation to spring training with the Atlanta Braves, in an attempt to return to the majors. But after being told he would not make the opening day lineup, López retired for good. "I feel perfect physically", he said. "It's just that the hitting wasn't there and unfortunately I didn't throw the guy out on the stealing attempts. That's a concern. I don't blame them. My role as a backup catcher is to be able to throw every single runner out." He plans to continue in the Atlanta Braves organization performing other duties. In a 15-season career, López posted a .287 average with 260 home runs and 864 RBI in 1,503 games. His 243 home runs as a catcher ranks eighth on the career list at that position. Strong defensively, he recorded a .992 fielding percentage. In 60 postseason games, he batted .278 (57-for-205) with 27 runs, 14 doubles, 10 home runs, 28 RBI and 14 walks. His final game was on September 2, 2006.

Personal
López married Analy Hernández. They have two children: Javier Alexander (born 11/6/95) and Kelvin Gabriel  (born 10/17/99). They divorced and López married his second wife Gina Brodbeck on June 23, 2004, and they have had two sons, Brody Brodbeck Lopez, born in 2010 and Gavin Richard Lopez in 2013.

Notes

See also

 List of Major League Baseball players from Puerto Rico
 List of Puerto Ricans
 List of Major League Baseball career home run leaders

References

External links

1970 births
Living people
National League Championship Series MVPs
National League All-Stars
Atlanta Braves players
Baltimore Orioles players
Boston Red Sox players
Major League Baseball catchers
Gulf Coast Braves players
Greenville Braves players
Richmond Braves players
Senadores de San Juan players
Baseball players from Atlanta
Major League Baseball players from Puerto Rico
2006 World Baseball Classic players
Sportspeople from Ponce, Puerto Rico
Silver Slugger Award winners